CTRP may mean:

 The Confederation of Workers of the Republic of Panama (Confederación de Trabajadores de la República de Panamá)
 The NASDAQ ticker symbol for Ctrip, a Chinese travel agency
 Comprehensive Tax Reform Program, part of Fiscal policy of the Philippines, enacted in 1997
 C1q/TNF related protein (CTRP) family, see Myokine.